Rolfsen is a surname derived from a masculine given name Rolf. Notable people with the surname include:

Alf Rolfsen, Norwegian painter and muralist
Christian Lange Rolfsen, Norwegian politician and attorney
Dale Rolfsen
Erik Rolfsen
Harald Rolfsen
Jens Rolfsen
Katie Rolfsen
Nordahl Rolfsen
Ulrik Imtiaz Rolfsen

Norwegian-language surnames